The spitfire sawfly (Perga affinis, family Pergidae) is a hymenopteran insect found in Australia. It is up to 22 mm long, has two pairs of wings, with a wingspan up to 40 mm, and its wings are honey colored. Its larvae are up to 80 mm long and somewhat resemble a caterpillar.

The sawfly derives its name from the saw-like ovipositor of the female, which is used to open holes in the plant within which she lays her eggs. While closely related to wasps, sawflies lack both the narrow waists and stings of wasps.

Although the adults of this sawfly species are not often seen, the larvae are quite conspicuous as they grow larger, resembling hairy caterpillars. Steelblue sawfly larvae are usually seen during the day in groups on the branches and stems of Eucalyptus trees. At night, they disperse to eat leaves of the host plants. When threatened, the larvae raise their heads and eject a strong-smelling. yellow-green liquid consisting predominantly of eucalyptus oil, to deter predators. This action gives them their common name of spitfires.

Description

The larvae vary from dark blue or black to yellow and brown depending on the species, and are up to 80 mm long. The body is sparsely covered with white, bristly hairs. During the day, the larvae congregate in clusters of 20 to 30 for protection and disperse at night to feed. The adult wasps are mainly black or brown, with yellowish markings and are about 25 mm long.

Lifecycle
The adults are found from about January to May, though mainly in autumn. Eggs are laid under leaf surfaces with the saw-like ovipositor. The larvae are mainly active during late winter and spring and enter the soil to pupate usually in mid-spring. Pupation takes place in strong. paper-like cocoons, which are often clustered several centimetres deep in the soil. The pupal stage may extend over two or three years before the adult emerges.

Damage
Larvae of spitfires feed on the foliage of young trees and regrowth stems, and can strip the branches of foliage, particularly at the tops. This is usually replaced during the spring-summer flush of leaf growth. Serious retardation of high growth may result from repeated attack, but host death is unusual. Wandoo is the most commonly attacked species in Western Australia.

Control
This defoliator rarely causes widespread damage, but where the clusters of larvae are accessible, the simplest method of control is to remove and destroy them during the day. Several parasitic wasps also have some controlling effect.

References

External links
Sawflies: a close relative of wasps Retrieved 2010-04-10. CSIRO.
Bug Guide Retrieved 26-10-2010
Thoughts on the evolution of insects 'from sawfly to ant' Retrieved 26-10-2010 Brisbane Insects
Sawflies Australian Museum

Tenthredinoidea
Hymenoptera of Australia